Barrer is a non-SI unit of gas permeability (specifically, gas permeability) used in the membrane technology and contact lens industry. It is named after Richard Barrer.

Definition

Here the 'cm3STP' is standard cubic centimeter, which is a unit of amount of gas rather than a unit of volume. It represents the number of gas molecules or moles that would occupy one cubic centimeter at standard temperature and pressure, as calculated via the ideal gas law.

The cm corresponds in the permeability equations to the thickness of the material whose permeability is being evaluated, the cm3STPcm−2s−1 to the flux of gas through the material, and the cmHg to the pressure drop across the material. That is, it measures the rate of fluid flow passing through an area of material with a thickness driven by a given pressure. See Darcy's Law.

In SI unit Barrer can be expressed as: 

To convert to CGS permeability unit, one must use the following:

Where M is the molecular weight of the penetrant gas (g/mol).

Another commonly expressed unit is Gas Permeance Unit (GPU). It is used in the measurement of gas permeance. Permeance can be expressed as the ratio of the permeability with the thickness of membrane.

Or in SI units:

References 

Units of measurement